Tephris ochreella is a species of moth in the family Pyralidae. It was described by Ragonot in 1893. It is found in Algeria, Tunisia, the Palestinian Territories, Iran and Pakistan.

References

Moths described in 1893
Phycitini
Moths of Asia
Moths of Africa